The abdominal internal oblique muscle, also internal oblique muscle or interior oblique, is an abdominal muscle in the abdominal wall that lies below the external oblique muscle and just above the transverse abdominal muscle.

Structure
Its fibers run perpendicular to the external oblique muscle, beginning in the thoracolumbar fascia of the lower back, the anterior 2/3 of the iliac crest (upper part of hip bone) and the lateral half of the inguinal ligament.  The muscle fibers run from these points superomedially (up and towards midline) to the muscle's insertions on the inferior borders of the 10th through 12th ribs and the linea alba.

In males, the cremaster muscle is also attached to the internal oblique.

Nerve supply
The internal oblique is supplied by the lower intercostal nerves, as well as the iliohypogastric nerve and the ilioinguinal nerve.

Function
The internal oblique performs two major functions.  Firstly as an accessory muscle of respiration, it acts as an antagonist (opponent) to the diaphragm, helping to reduce the volume of the chest cavity during exhalation.  When the diaphragm contracts, it pulls the lower wall of the chest cavity down, increasing the volume of the lungs which then fill with air.  Conversely, when the internal obliques contract they compress the organs of the abdomen, pushing them up into the diaphragm which intrudes back into the chest cavity reducing the volume of the air-filled lungs, producing an exhalation.

Secondly, its contraction causes ipsilateral rotation and side-bending. It acts with the external oblique muscle of the opposite side to achieve this torsional movement of the trunk.  For example, the right internal oblique and the left external oblique contract as the torso flexes and rotates to bring the left shoulder towards the right hip.  For this reason, the internal obliques are referred to as "same-side rotators."

Additional images

See also 

Abdominal exercise

References
 Moore, Keith L; & Dalley Arthur R (2006). Clinically Oriented Anatomy (5th ed.). Lippincott Williams and Wilkins. .
 Abdominal, unm.edu

External links

  - "Incision and reflection of the internal abdominal oblique muscle."
 

Muscles of the torso
Spine flexors
Spine lateral flexors
Spine rotators